Parabathymyrus macrophthalmus is an eel in the family Congridae (conger/garden eels). It was described by Toshiji Kamohara in 1938. It is a tropical, marine eel which is known from the Indo-West Pacific, including Japan, Taiwan, the South China Sea, and Indonesia. Males can reach a maximum total length of 47 centimetres.

References

Congridae
Taxa named by Toshiji Kamohara
Fish described in 1938
Fish of Vietnam